Eugyrinus is an extinct genus of dendrerpetontid temnospondyl. It was originally named Hylonomus wildi in 1891 by Arthur Smith Woodward.

References 

 Prehistoric amphibian
 List of prehistoric amphibians

Dendrerpetontidae
Fossil taxa described in 1891